Caroline Garcia and Kristina Mladenovic defeated Coco Gauff and Jessica Pegula in the final, 2–6, 6–3, 6–2 to win the women's doubles tennis title at the 2022 French Open. It was their second French Open title as a team (the first being in 2016). Mladenovic extended her winning streak at the event to 18 consecutive match wins and three titles, having last lost in the quarterfinals of the 2018 tournament (she did not play in 2021).

Barbora Krejčíková and Kateřina Siniaková were the reigning champions, but were unable to defend their title as Krejčíková tested positive for COVID-19 before their first round match. As a result, Elise Mertens regained the WTA No. 1 doubles ranking from Siniaková. The elimination of Sania Mirza and Lucie Hradecká in the third round guaranteed two first-time French Open doubles finalists from the top half of the draw, those ultimately being Gauff and Pegula.

Mertens and Mirza were vying to complete the career Grand Slam, but Mertens lost in the third round to Xu Yifan and Yang Zhaoxuan, while Mirza lost in the third round to Gauff and Pegula.

Seeds

Draw

Finals

Top half

Section 1

Section 2

Bottom half

Section 3

Section 4

Seeded teams 
The following are the seeded teams, based on WTA rankings as of 16 May 2022.

Other entry information

Wildcards

Protected ranking

Alternates

Withdrawals
  Aliona Bolsova /  Marie Bouzková → replaced by  Emina Bektas /  Tara Moore
  Anna Kalinskaya /  Ana Konjuh → replaced by  Dalma Gálfi /  Anna Kalinskaya
  Barbora Krejčíková /  Kateřina Siniaková → replaced by  Anna-Lena Friedsam /  Tatjana Maria
  Andrea Petkovic /  Clara Tauson → replaced by  Tereza Martincová /  Andrea Petkovic
  Arantxa Rus /  Mayar Sherif → replaced by  Samantha Murray Sharan /  Heather Watson

References

External links
Main draw

French Open - Doubles
Women's Doubles